The comic book character Marvelman has been the subject of several legal issues, even after being renamed as Miracleman in 1985. The character and its' derivatives were created by Mick Anglo in 1954 at the request of publisher Len Miller. The copyright was retained by Anglo (and, since his 2011 death, his estate) ever since. However a series of misconceptions and misunderstandings meant that, following the character's revival in 1982 and the collapse of publisher Eclipse Comics in 1994 the series spent 15 years out of print while various parties who believed they had portions of the rights attempted to claim ownership, a belief that greatly informed coverage of Miracleman during the interregnum. This was resolved by the confirmation of Anglo's ownership in 2009.

Original creation

Ironically, Anglo actually created the character in response to legal issues. Hackney publisher L. Miller & Son had bypassed British law forbidding imported American comics by licensing Captain Marvel and Captain Marvel Jr material from Fawcett Publications, which Miller then repackaged as a weekly comic for sale in the British market. The titles were a success; however only a few months after they began the American legal system handed out a long-gestating judgement, ruling that Captain Marvel infringed partially on DC Comics' Superman. With superhero comic sales falling anyway as the Golden Age market contracted, Fawcett simply cancelled their range of superhero comics. Not wanting to lose one of their bestsellers, Miller hired Anglo's Gower Street Studio to create a similar but distinct pair of characters to continue the series, resulting in the creation of Marvelman and Young Marvelman in 1954. They were even more successful than their predecessors and their series ran until 1963, when the impact of re-legalised imported American comics and the competing boys' weeklies of Fleetway Publications and DC Thomson made them unprofitable. Miller ended its' comics publishing in 1963, with the masters for such material being purchased by rival Alan Class Comics.

At the time it was rare for creators to retain rights to their output, which was generally done as work-for-hire with the copyrights retained by the publisher. What little indicia were in the Miller comics (a broad statement noting "All stories and illustrations are the copyright of the Publishers and must not be reproduced without permission") seemed to support this but some strips bear text reading "© Mick Anglo". Whether by default or design Anglo thus retained copyright on the Marvelman characters - though that the works stayed in publication after Anglo left Miller and set up his own Anglo Features (complete with the title Captain Miracle, an obvious clone based on redrawn Marvelman material) suggests even the artist himself was unaware of this. Anglo moved away from creating comics to compiling material for the British market, while Alan Class Comics only used a small amount of the material acquired from Miller, none of it featuring the Marvelman character, which spent the remainder of the next two decades out of print.

Revival

In 1982 Marvelman was revived at the instigation of Dez Skinn of Quality Communications, for the anthology Warrior. There are conflicting accounts of how this was arranged; Skinn has claimed he believed the character was in the public domain, and that later royalties paid to Anglo were a friendly gesture; the new strip's writer Alan Moore recalled Skinn telling him he had purchased the rights from the Official Receiver's Office, while Moore's successor Neil Gaiman would claim Skinn later told him he had done nothing of the sort, instead reaching an informal private agreement with Anglo. In 2001 Anglo recalled that "Dez contacted me and he wanted to revive it and I said go ahead and do what you like." Moore would grow doubtful that the character's ownership had been acquired correctly by Skinn, and in 2001 speculated that Anglo retained ownership throughout - something that would turn out to be correct some eight years later.

The subsequent chain of perceived owners from 1982 until the resolution of the ownership debate in 2009 were all based on the misconception that the rights hadn't actually been retained by Anglo throughout.

Quality Communications
At this stage, that Anglo retained ownership of the Marvelman characters was unknown. Skinn told Moore that he had purchased the rights from the Official Receiver following the liquidation of L. Miller & Son in 1966, something the writer initially accepted but later began to question as his relationship with the editor soured. Skinn for his part has recalled that he did nothing of the sort - believing the character to be in the public domain - and instead entered into an informal agreement with Anglo, an arrangement he later reiterated to Neil Gaiman. Anglo for his part recalled that "Dez contacted me and he wanted to revive it and I said go ahead and do what you like.". Warrior had an unusual pay structure for the comics industry of the period; while Skinn offered lower page rates than Quality's competitors the content creators would be given "shares" in their characters, which would allow them to earn considerable royalties if material was reprinted in overseas syndication or albums. Believing he had the right to do so, Skinn split ownership of Marvelman three ways between Quality, Moore and Leach. When Leach was replaced by Alan Davis the deal was restructured, with Moore, Leach and Davis each owning 28% of the character and Quality Communications 15%. Warrior was a critical success but not a financial one, its' losses being subsidised from Skinn's profitable comics shops. Behind the scenes things soon became fraught as well, with some creators feeling they deserved greater payment for the magazine's more popular features, and chaffing against the restriction Skinn's dream of a shared universe imposed on future material.

Meanwhile, Skinn, a former Marvel UK editor, had been wary of using Marvelman's name on the covers and attracting litigation. However, in 1984, with Marvelman having won Eagle Awards and featuring the name on the front of Warrior #5 and again on #16, and decided the rival publisher was unlikely to protest. As a result, he put together the Marvelman Summer Special, consisting of a framing sequence by Moore and Davis, a trio of Anglo-era reprint tales and a story featuring Skinn's own character Big Ben. The use of the word 'Marvel' on the cover however resulted in legal action being taken by Marvel Comics. Their British legal agents Jacques & Lewis sent a cease and desist notice to Quality Communications, which Skinn printed in the editorial pages of Warrior #25. This unusual step resulted in an exchange of letters with the practice, which Skinn again printed. While Skinn publicly implying the legal action was the reason the strip had disappeared, when in fact Moore and Davis had fallen out.

Parallel to their work on Marvelman, Moore and Davis were also collaborating on a Captain Britain strip for Marvel UK. However, Moore stopped working for the British wing of the company following what he felt was the unfair sacking of editor Bernie Jaye and their sanctioning of reprints of material from Doctor Who Monthly in America featuring characters he owned without clearance or correct attribution. While the Captain Britain strip itself continued with new writer Jamie Delano, the fallout led to Moore refusing to sign off on a deal to have his and Davis' work reprinted for the American market. Incensed by both Marvel's objection to the use of a name of a character which had debuted before the company had even began using the name and what he perceived as strong-arming a smaller publisher with legal muscle, Moore wrote a letter to Marvel's American headquarters, vowing to never work for the company again. The strip was unable to continue without approval from all the perceived shareholders; a young Grant Morrison, having recently began working on Warrior strip The Liberators, was eager to take over but this was vetoed by Moore

Before any continuation of the story or further legal developments could take place, Warrior ended in 1985 after 26 issues, having lost Skinn what he would later estimate at between $36,000 to $40,000. He switched his attention to syndicating its contents for the American market as a package through Mike Friedrich of Star*Reach. At this stage Moore was refusing any attempt to rename the character. DC Comics liked the material but Dick Giordano refused on the grounds that the company was having enough trouble with Marvel over the trademark to Captain Marvel and didn't need another potential clash. Marvel themselves also passed; while Editor-in-chief Jim Shooter liked the strip he felt any character with Marvel in their name would be seen as an ambassador for the company, which didn't fit the revisionist nature of the story.

Pacific Comics
Moore would eventually relent and allow the character to be renamed Miracleman (ironically a name previously used for an alternative universe version of the character in a story he wrote for Marvel's Captain Britain), allowing a deal to be struck with Pacific Comics. However reprints hit a fresh snag when Davis - in what he later admitted was a counterstroke to Moore's refusal to allow Captain Britain reprints - blocked use of the character.

Eclipse Comics
During this impasse Pacific Comics folded, and their assets were purchased by Eclipse Comics co-founder Dean Mullaney. Davis was initially still reluctant, especially considering Eclipse made what he felt were derisory offers, but eventually tired of bitter phone-calls with Skinn and Moore and handed his share to Leach. Davis' permission was still required to reprint his work for the Eclipse series; the artist has stated he never gave consent; while Moore has said the title was delayed while he tried to ascertain if the correct authorisation had been arranged by the publisher, Miracleman #1 was released on 16 July 1985. Both the story and the characters were renamed to avoid further legal attention from Marvel. In early 1986 Eclipse would buy out the perceived shares owned by Skinn and Leach, leading to a situation with the publisher believing they owned 2/3rds of the property and Moore 1/3rd.

Skinn, Leach, Davis and Moore have all gone on the record to say they were not correctly paid by Eclipse, with Skinn noted that Anglo also went unpaid for reprints of his work. After wrapping up his acclaimed run on the series in Miracleman #16, Moore handpicked Neil Gaiman as his successor and gave him his perceived share, which the new writer then split with artist Mark Buckingham. Gaiman would later also note Eclipse's poor record with payments, noting he and Buckingham eventually adopted a system whereby they would not start work on an issue until they had been paid for the next as an explanation for the supposedly bimonthly title's frequent delays. For her part, Eclipse editor-in-chief Catherine Yronwode would use Miracleman #24's letters column to accuse Skinn of not passing on payments to creators, and falsely representing himself as agent of cover artist Mick Austin - something Skinn denied.

Despite Miracleman itself being a commercial and critical success a mixture of the mid-1990s evolution of the direct market distribution system, an audit initated by Toren Smith that revealed fraudulent accounting and the fractious divorce of Mullaney and Yronwoode led to Eclipse collapsing in 1994. The company had complete versions of both Miracleman #25 and the first issue of spinoff Miracleman Triumphant but due to their parlous financial state no printer would extend them credit. Claiming she was worried about Mulvaney's erratic behaviour, she returned the artwork to the creators.

McFarlane Productions
Eclipse's assets were purchased in 1996 by Spawn creator Todd McFarlane for $25,000. Among them were the masters for Miracleman; McFarlane also believed it included the rights to the characters. One-time collaborators, Gaiman and McFarlane were already in dispute over the ownership of the character Angela, and the purchase of the Eclipse property drove a further wedge between them as McFarlane outbid Gaiman's friend Roger Broughton in the process. The former believed that legally the character would revert to the creators in the event of the title being cancelled, and a drawn-out legal battle began.

In 2001, McFarlane said that he owned all rights related to Miracleman, dismissing Neil Gaiman's claims of co-ownership, and announced that the character would appear in Hellspawn. In the same year Marvel's new EiC Joe Quesada declared that the company would not pursue any legal action against use of the name 'Marvelman' on any future continuation, also announcing the commissioning of the maxi-series Marvel: 1602 from Gaiman. Profits from the series would be donated to Marvels and Miracles, LLC - a concern formed by Gaiman and his lawyer Kenneth F. Levin to pursue ownership of Miracleman. The writer's dedication in the collected editions of 1602 reads, in part, "To Todd, for making it necessary".

McFarlane introduced Mike Moran (Miracleman's alter ego) in Hellspawn #6 in February 2001, with the alleged intention of returning Miracleman himself in Hellspawn #13. The artist also released a Miracleman cold-cast statue, as well as a  scale action figure that was partnered with Spawn in a San Diego Comic-Con exclusive two-pack. In 2002 Gaiman sued McFarlane over his unauthorised use of Miracleman and the characters he had created for Spawn (including Angela, Cogliostro and Medieval Spawn. According to Gaiman, the evidence presented in the course of the lawsuit revealed that the rights for Miracleman were not included in McFarlane's purchase of Eclipse Comics assets.

For the duration of the legal proceedings, Miracleman was out of print, leading to back issues and trade paperbacks of the series greatly increasing in the collector's market.

Resolution
It emerged in 2009 that original creator Mick Anglo had retained the rights to Marvelman from the beginning, meaning that the purchase of those rights by Quality Communications, Eclipse and McFarlane was illegitimate.

At the San Diego Comic Con in 2009, Marvel Comics announced they had purchased the rights to Marvelman, "one of the most important comic book characters in decades", from Mick Anglo. In June 2010, a "Marvelman Classic Primer" one-shot was published, featuring new art and interviews with Mick Anglo and others involved in Marvelman's history. In July 2010, a new ongoing series called Marvelman: Family’s Finest launched reprinting "Marvelman’s greatest adventures." A hardcover reprint edition, Marvelman Classic Vol. 1, was released in August 2010. These reprints contain only early material. Alan Moore has stated that he would donate some of his royalties from any Marvel reprints of his Marvelman stories to Mick Anglo.

A delay followed before the revival material was published, with Marvel Senior Vice President of Publishing Tom Brevoort assuring fans that it would be published as "soon as everything is ready". By 2012 Marvel had secured the 'Miracleman' trademark and at New York Comic Con 2013 announced the reprints and eventual continuation would use this name. At the 2018 SDCC Marvel used a retailer-only event to announced legal hurdles causing the cancellation had been resolved and the continuing in 2019 with the previously announced creative team of Gaiman and Buckingham on board.; after further delays the story finally continued in 2022.

Notes

References

Comics controversies
Miracleman